Sympistis riparia, the dune sympistis, is a moth of the family Noctuidae. The species was first described by Herbert Knowles Morrison in 1875. It is native to North America and it is listed as a species of special concern in Massachusetts and in Connecticut.

References

riparia
Moths described in 1875